1-Day
2-CdA
2-PAM
292 MEP
311C90
3F8
3M Avagard
3M Cavilon Skin Cleanser
3TC
5-ASA
5-FC
5-FU
6-MP
642 Tablet
8-Hour Bayer (Extended-release Bayer 8-Hour), a form of aspirin
8-methoxy-psoralen, also known as methoxsalen (INN)
8-Mop or 8-methoxy-psoralen, also known as methoxsalen (INN)